The tankini is a bathing suit combining a tank top, mostly made of spandex-and-cotton or Lycra-and-nylon, and a bikini bottom introduced in the late 1990s. This type of swimwear is considered by some to provide modesty closer to a one-piece suit with the convenience of a two-piece suit, as the entire suit need not be removed in order to use a toilet. Tankinis come in a variety of styles, colors, and shapes, some include features such as integrated push-up bras. It is particularly popular as children's beachwear, and athletic outfit good enough for a triathlon. According to Katherine Betts, Vogue's fashion-news director, this amphibious sportswear for sand or sea lets users go rafting, play volleyball, and swim without worrying about losing their top.

A tank top consists of a sleeveless shirt with low neck and adjustable shoulder straps that vary in width and style. It is named after tank suits, one-piece bathing costumes of the 1920s worn in tanks or swimming pools. The upper garment is worn either by men or women, having a greater variety of models available for women. In men it is usually used as underwear.

Etymology
According to author William Safire, "The most recent evolution of the -kini family is the tankini, a cropped tank top supported by spaghetti-like strings." The tankini is distinguished from the classic bikini by the difference in tops, the top of the tankini essentially being a tank top. The tankini top extends downward to somewhere between just above the navel and the top of the hips. The word is a portmanteau of the tank of tank top and the suffix of bikini. This go-between nature of tankini has rendered its name to things ranging from a lemonade-based martini (Tankini Martini) to server architecture (Tankini HipThread). The Language Report, compiled by lexicographer Susie Dent and published by the Oxford University Press (OUP) in 2003, considers lexicographic inventions like bandeaukini and camkini, two variants of the tankini, important to observe.

History

Tankini and the concept of mix-and-match swimwears were the two major innovations in that genre in late 1990s. Designer Anne Cole, the US swimwear mogul, was the originator of this style. She was the woman behind the California swimwear label bearing her name and launched as an offshoot of her family's pioneering swimsuit company. Hailed as the first major innovation in women's swimsuit design in several 
decades, the tankini, Cole's clever two- piece, which blended the freedom of a bikini with the more modest coverage of a one-piece bathing suit, quickly captured nearly a third of the swimwear market. Her biggest hit, the tankini, came in 1998 when her label introduced the innovation. This two-piece suit with a top half that covered more of the torso than a standard bikini top was first devised by Cole for herself as a young girl. Aimed at closing a gap in the swimwear market, the popularity of tankini largely came from Cole's tapping into women's anxieties about swimwear. In the six seasons following its introduction, tankinis diversified in style and range, adding other big name designers like Ralph Lauren, Donna Karan, Nautica, and Calvin Klein. In 2005, a controversy broke out when Buddhists complained against swimwear manufacturer Ondade Mar and lingerie giant Victoria's Secret started marketing tankinis featuring Buddhist iconography. In the same year, Nike's breast cancer awareness swimwear collection featured four different cuts of tankini.

Usage
Tankinis are suggested as an option for women who had gone through mastectomy, i.e. removal of one or both breasts by surgery, modest bust sizes, and long-torsos. For women who don't have washboard abs, Betts commented, "If you don't feel comfortable wearing a bikini, the tankini's an option that's sort of in between." In Think & Date Like a Man, fashion writer April Masini suggests wearing a tankini for women with smaller breasts and less-than-toned abdomens as the most flattering choice of beachwear, with the right amount of coverage along with the feeling of a two-piece suit. A not-too-close-fitting tankini, ensembled with a sarong, has been suggested for gymnophobia or the fear of nudity. Tankinis, sometimes divided in front exposing the navel, exist for pregnant women.

Variants

Gucci's crystal-studded tankini, on the May 1998 covers of both Harper's Bazaar and Cosmopolitan was as expensive as US$2,425, while bargain tankinis were available at less than US$10. Variations of the tankini, dubbed by Cole as the "ini sisters." made mostly of spandex-and-cotton or Lycra-and-nylon, has been added by designers and retailers, chiefly Cole of California and Mervyns, to maximize the tankini sales. Fashion experts also suggest tankini-style wedding dresses for brides of a certain body-types, i.e. athletic long legs.

Camkini
A camkini is a tankini with spaghetti straps of a camisole top instead of tank-shaped straps over a bikini bottom. Ebony Fashion Fair's traveling fashion show in 2000 presented camikinis as one of the top trends that year. Point Sol, a fashion house, offers higher-waist bottoms and a sports camisole as a more sports-oriented swimsuit style for volleyball and in-line skating.

See also 
 Bikini variants

References

External links 
 

Swimsuits
Bikinis

de:Bikini#Tankini